is a Japanese actress.

Filmography
 Tokyo Zombie (2005) as Yoko
 Humoresque: Sakasama no chou (2006)
 3 Year Pregnant (2006) as Midoriko
 M (2007)
 The Red Army (2007)
 Bandage (2008) as Kozue
 Bakabakance (2008)
 Topless (2008)
 Sweet Rain (2008)
 The Code (2009)
 28 1/2 (2010)
 Salaryman NEO The Movie (2011)
 The Woman of S.R.I. the Movie (2021)

References

External links

1981 births
Living people
Japanese actresses
Stardust Promotion artists